Riivo Valge (born 24 September 1975) is an Estonian military personnel.

Since 2012 he was the commander of Estonian Air Force's Headquarters. From 2018 to 2019 he was the commander of Estonian Air Forces.

In 2001 he was awarded with Order of the Cross of the Eagle's silver cross.

References

Living people
1975 births
Estonian military personnel